Cyclostremella humilis is a species of sea snail, a marine gastropod mollusk in the family Pyramidellidae, the pyrams and their allies. The species is one of three known species to exist within the genus, Cyclostremella. The other species being Cyclostremella concordia and Cyclostremella orbis.

Distribution
This species occurs in the following locations:
 Gulf of Mexico

References

External links
 To Biodiversity Heritage Library (8 publications)
 To Encyclopedia of Life
 To USNM Invertebrate Zoology Mollusca Collection
 To ITIS
 To World Register of Marine Species

Pyramidellidae
Gastropods described in 1897